CCH may refer to:

Companies
CCH (company), a tax software company
CCH Canadian, CCH's Canadian subsidiary
Coca-Cola HBC AG, Coca-Cola Hellenic

Education
Cadet College Hasan Abdal, a boarding school in Pakistan
Centre for Computing in the Humanities, an academic department and research centre at King's College London
Columbia College Hollywood, a film school in California
Covington Catholic High School, a private high school in Park Hills, Kentucky

Medicine
Central Clinical Hospital, a Russian hospital
Central Council of Homoeopathy, an Indian professional council of homeopathy
Certified Clinical Hypnotherapist, a practitioner of hypnotherapy
John H. Stroger Jr. Hospital of Cook County, formerly known as Cook County Hospital

People
C. C. H. Pounder (born 1950), American actress

Physics
Cosmic censorship hypothesis, a conjecture about the structure of gravitational singularities ("black holes")

Other uses
CCH Canadian Ltd v Law Society of Upper Canada, a leading Supreme Court of Canada case on originality in copyrights
Chief of Chaplains of the United States Army, the chief supervising officer of the U.S. Army Chaplain Corps
Community Campaign (Hart), a political party in the Hart District, England
Computerized Criminal History, a system used by the FBI and a number of US states
Concealed carry, of a handgun